"Not Tonight" is a song performed by the American rapper Lil' Kim featuring Jermaine Dupri for her debut studio album Hard Core (1996). A remix was released the following year featuring female rappers Da Brat, Missy "Misdeameanor" Elliott, Angie Martinez, and Lisa "Left Eye" Lopes for the Nothing to Lose soundtrack. It was released on June 24, 1997, by Atlantic Records.

The remix became a hit in the U.S., peaking at number six on the Billboard Hot 100 and number two on the Rap Songs chart, and was nominated for Best Rap Performance by a Duo or Group at the 40th Annual Grammy Awards. Internationally, "Not Tonight" peaked at number four in New Zealand and entered the top 20 on the UK Singles Chart, reaching number 11.

Background
The original version of "Not Tonight" was featured on Lil' Kim's first album Hard Core. It was produced by Jermaine Dupri, who was also featured on the song. This version samples "Turn Your Love Around" by George Benson. The song is about Lil' Kim feeling blasé about traditional vaginal intercourse and preferring a man perform cunnilingus on her, presumably at least for that evening.

The remix, known as "Not Tonight (Ladies Night Remix)", was released as a single and was performed by Lil' Kim, Da Brat, Missy Elliott, Angie Martinez and Lisa "Left Eye" Lopes". It was featured on the Nothing to Lose soundtrack. This version samples "Ladies' Night" by Kool & the Gang. The remix became a top 40 hit in the US, the UK, Canada, New Zealand and the Netherlands. It was produced by Rashad "Ringo" Smith.

Music video
The video was shot in West Palm Beach, Florida, from June 27 to 28, 1997. The video starts showing the girls on a boat and eventually in a jungle setting. The music video shows clips from the movie Nothing to Lose. It also features guest appearances from other female celebrities including Mary J. Blige, T-Boz, Queen Latifah, SWV, Xscape, Blaque, Changing Faces, Total, Leslie Segar and Maia Campbell.

Formats and track listings
U.S. CD/cassette single
 "Not Tonight" (Remix)
 "Not Tonight" (Instrumental)

U.S. maxi-single
 "Not Tonight" (Remix)
 "Crush On You" (Remix)
 "Drugs"
 "Not Tonight"
 "Crush On You"
 "Not Tonight" (Remix instrumental)
 "Drugs" (Instrumental)
 "Not Tonight" (Original instrumental)

U.S. 12" vinyl
 "Not Tonight" (Remix)
 "Not Tonight" (Instrumental remix)
 "Drugs"
 "Crush on You" (Remix)
 "Crush on You" (Remix instrumental)
 "Drugs" (Instrumental)

Europe CD single
 "Not Tonight" (Remix)
 "Not Tonight" (Remix Instrumental)
 "Drugs" (Album Version)
 "Drugs" (Instrumental)

UK cassette single
 "Not Tonight" (Remix)
 "Drugs" (Album Version)

Credits and personnel
Credits from "Not Tonight" are taken from the single's liner notes.

Recording
Recorded at Sound-On-Sound, The Hit Factory & Capitol Recording Studio
Recorded by Ed Raso, Andy Cardenas & Bill Smith

Personnel
Vocals – Lil' Kim, Da Brat, Missy Elliott, Angie Martinez, and Lisa "Left Eye" Lopes
Songwriting – K. Jones, M. Elliott, L. Lopes, S. Harris, A. Martinez, R. Bell, G. Brown, M. Muhammed, C. Smith, J. Taylor, D. Thomas, E. Toon
Producer – Armando Colon, Rashad Smith
Mixing – Rick Travali and L. Lopes

Charts

Weekly charts

Year-end charts

Certifications

References

1997 singles
Lisa Lopes songs
Lil' Kim songs
Missy Elliott songs
Da Brat songs
Songs written by Missy Elliott
Songs written by Lisa Lopes
Songs written by Da Brat
1996 songs
Atlantic Records singles
Tommy Boy Records singles
Songs written by Lil' Kim